The Syria Newroz Killings were attacks on Kurds in Raqqa and Qamishli in northern Syria during Newroz, the Kurdish New Year celebrations.

Qamishli incident
The first incident took place on 20 March 2008 in Qamishli, al-Hasakah Governorate, according to Human Rights Watch, Syrian security forces opened fire at Kurds celebrating the festival of Newroz. The shooting left three people dead and at least five injured. The city was renowned for throwing a large Christmas parade every year in December, and celebrating Newroz festival by a large crowd every year in March.

Raqqa City incident
The second incident involved a Syrian police attack on the Kurdish population in Raqqa city, who had gathered to celebrate the Kurdish new year (Newroz festival) in March 2010. The attack by Syrian police left 2 or 3 people killed, one of them a 15-year-old girl, and more than 50 people wounded.

See also
 Rojava
 Kurdistan

References

External links
http://www.amnestyusa.org/actioncenter/actions/uaa07010.pdf
https://web.archive.org/web/20100617074347/http://articles.sfgate.com/2010-03-29/world/20827345_1_syrian-kurds-nowruz-kurdish-minority

2008 mass shootings in Asia
2010 in Syria
2010 mass shootings in Asia
2008 murders in Syria
2010 murders in Syria
Attacks during the New Year celebrations
Crime in al-Hasakah Governorate
Crime in Raqqa Governorate
History of al-Hasakah Governorate
History of Raqqa Governorate
History of the Kurdish people
Human rights abuses in Syria
Kurds in Syria
March 2008 crimes
March 2008 events in Asia
March 2010 crimes
March 2010 events in Syria
Mass shootings in Syria
Qamishli
Raqqa